Magister Franciscus was a French composer-poet in the ars nova style of late medieval music. He is known for two surviving works, the three-part ballades: De Narcissus and Phiton, Phiton, beste tres venimeuse; the former was widely distributed in his lifetime. Modern scholarship disagrees on whether Franciscus was the same person as the composer F. Andrieu.

Identity career
Franciscus may be the same person as the F. Andrieu who wrote Armes, amours/O flour des flours, a déploration on the death of poet-composer Guillaume de Machaut (–1377). Although, the scholarly consensus on this identification is unclear. He may also be Franciscus de Goano or Johannes Franchois. Machaut was the most dominant and important composer of the 14th century, and Franciscus's works show many similarities to his, suggesting the two were contemporaries.

Music
Only two of his works survive, the three-part ballades: De Narcissus and Phiton, Phiton, beste tres venimeuse. They are both contained in the Chantilly Codex. Reaney notes that Magister Franciscus's works are likely earlier than Andrieu's, between 1370 and 1376.

Works

Editions
Franciscus's works are included in the following collections:

Recordings

References

Notes

Citations

Sources
Books

 
 
 

Journals and articles

External links
 
 Works by Magister Franciscus in the Medieval Music Database from La Trobe University

French classical composers
French male classical composers
14th-century French composers
Medieval male composers
Ars nova composers
Year of birth unknown
Year of death unknown